Little House on the Prairie (Little House: A New Beginning in its ninth and final season) is an American Western historical drama television series about the Ingalls family, who live on a farm on Plum Creek near Walnut Grove, Minnesota, in the 1870s–90s. Charles, Laura, Caroline, Mary, and Carrie Ingalls are respectively portrayed by Michael Landon, Melissa Gilbert, Karen Grassle, and Melissa Sue Anderson and twins Lindsay and Sydney Greenbush.  The show is an adaptation of Laura Ingalls Wilder's best-selling series of Little House books.

In 1972, with the encouragement of his wife and daughter, television producer and former NBC executive Ed Friendly acquired the film and television rights to Wilder’s novels from Roger Lea MacBride and engaged Blanche Hanalis to write the teleplay for a two-hour motion picture pilot.  Friendly then asked Michael Landon to direct the pilot; Landon agreed on the condition that he may also play Charles Ingalls. The pilot, which first aired on March 30, 1974, was based on Laura Ingalls Wilder's third Little House book, Little House on the Prairie. The rest of the regular series premiered on the NBC network on September 11, 1974, and last aired on May 10, 1982.

During the 1982–83 television season, with the departure of Landon and Grassle, a sequel series, generally considered Season Nine for syndicated packages, was broadcast with the new title Little House: A New Beginning,

Cast and characters

Melissa Gilbert has the most appearances of the series, a total of 190 of the 204 episodes. Michael Landon appeared in all but four episodes of seasons one through eight, but departed from being a regular part of the cast when the show was retooled as Little House: A New Beginning (season nine).

Main cast
Michael Landon as Charles Ingalls  (seasons 1–8, guest in 9, two post-series movies)
Karen Grassle as Caroline Quiner Ingalls (seasons 1–8, one post-series movie)
Melissa Gilbert as Laura Ingalls Wilder (seasons 1–9, three post-series movies)
Melissa Sue Anderson as Mary Ingalls Kendall (seasons 1–7, guest in 8) 
Lindsay and Sidney Greenbush as Carrie Ingalls (seasons 1–8)
Matthew Labyorteaux as young Charles Ingalls and Albert (Quinn) Ingalls (seasons 5–8, guest in 9, one post-series movie)
Richard Bull as Nels Oleson (seasons 1–9, three post-series movies)
Katherine MacGregor as Harriet Oleson (seasons 1–9)
Alison Arngrim as Nellie Oleson Dalton (seasons 1–7, guest in 9)
Jonathan Gilbert as Willie Oleson (seasons 1–9, two post-series movies)
Victor French as Mr. Edwards (seasons 1–3, guest in 6, 8–9, three post-series movies)
Bonnie Bartlett as Grace Snider Edwards (seasons 1–3, guest in 6)
Kevin Hagen as Dr. Hiram Baker (seasons 1–9, three post-series movies)
Dabbs Greer as Rev. Robert Alden (seasons 1–9, two post-series movies)
Charlotte Stewart as Eva Beadle Simms (seasons 1–4)
Karl Swenson as Lars Hanson (seasons 1–5)
Radames Pera as John (Sanderson, Jr.) Edwards (seasons 2-4)
Brian Part as Carl (Sanderson) Edwards (seasons 2-3)
Kyle Richards as Alicia (Sanderson) Edwards (seasons 2–3, guest in 6, 8)
Merlin Olsen as Jonathan Garvey (seasons 4–7)
Hersha Parady as Alice Garvey (seasons 4–6)
Patrick Labyorteaux as Andrew "Andy" Garvey (seasons 4–7)
Linwood Boomer as Adam Kendall (seasons 4–7, guest in 8)
Ketty Lester as Hester-Sue Terhune (seasons 5–9)
Wendi and Brenda Turnbaugh as Grace Ingalls (seasons 5–8)
Queenie Smith as Mrs. Amanda 'May' Whipple (seasons 1-4)
Dean Butler as Almanzo Wilder (seasons 6–9, three post series movies)
Lucy Lee Flippin as Eliza Jane Wilder (season 6, guest in 7 and 8)
Steve Tracy as Percival Dalton (season 6 and 7)
Jason Bateman as James (Cooper) Ingalls (seasons 7 and 8)
Melissa Francis as Cassandra (Cooper) Ingalls (seasons 7 and 8)
Allison Balson as Nancy Oleson (seasons 8 and 9, three post-series movies)
Shannen Doherty as Jenny Wilder (season 9, three post-series movies)
Stan Ivar as John Carter (season 9)
David Friedman as Jason Carter (season 9)
Lindsay Kennedy as Jeb Carter (season 9)
Pamela Roylance as Sarah Reed Carter (season 9)

Guest stars
Many actors, who were either well-known or went on to become famous, guest-starred on the show.

Episodes

Background and production

Development 
Of the 204 episodes, Michael Landon directed the largest number at 87; producer William F. Claxton handled the next largest number of the remaining shows at 68, while co-star Victor French helmed 18. Maury Dexter (who was often an assistant director) and Leo Penn directed the remaining episodes at 21 and three episodes, respectively.

Interior shots were filmed at Paramount Studios in Los Angeles, while exteriors were largely filmed at the nearby Big Sky Ranch in Simi Valley, where the town of Walnut Grove had been constructed. Many other filming locations were also used during the course of the series, including Old Tucson Studios and Sonora, California. Many of the exterior shots of Walnut Grove and the other Minnesota towns shown in the series include noticeable mountainous terrain in the background scenery. In reality, however, the southern Minnesota landscape where the show is supposed to take place includes no tall mountains.

The series theme song was titled "The Little House" and was written and conducted by David Rose. The ending theme music, also written by Rose, originally appeared as a piece of incidental music in a later-season episode of Michael Landon's previous long-running series, Bonanza.

Themes 
Little House explored many different themes including frequently portrayed ones of adoption, alcoholism, faith, poverty, blindness, and prejudice of all types, including racism. Some plots also include subjects such as drug addiction (e.g. Albert's addiction to morphine), leukemia, child abuse, animal abuse, and even rape. Although predominantly a drama, the program has many lighthearted and comedic moments, as well.

Some of the episodes written by Michael Landon were recycled storylines from ones that he had written for Bonanza. Season two's "A Matter of Faith" was based on the Bonanza episode "A Matter of Circumstance"; season five's "Someone Please Love Me" was based on the Bonanza episode "A Dream To Dream"; season seven's "The Silent Cry" was based on the Bonanza episode "The Sound of Sadness"; season eight's "He Was Only Twelve" was based on the Bonanza episode "He Was Only Seven"; and season nine's "Little Lou" was based on the Bonanza episode "It's A Small World".

In 1997, TV Guide ranked the two-part episode "I'll Be Waving as You Drive Away" at 97 on its 100 Greatest Episodes of All Time list; the episode was about Mary going blind.

Release

Broadcast
Little House on the Prairie ran on NBC from September 11, 1974 to March 21, 1983.  From September 1974 to September 1976, it was aired on Wednesday nights from 8:00-9:00 EST.  Beginning September, 1976, it was moved to Monday nights in the same time slot.

Syndication
In the U.S., television syndication rights are currently owned by NBCUniversal Television Distribution. Originally, NBC licensed these rights to Worldvision Enterprises, since networks could not own syndication arms at the time. As a result of corporate changes, Paramount Domestic Television (now CBS Television Distribution, later renamed as CBS Media Ventures since 2021) would inherit the rights via Spelling Entertainment, and NBCUniversal re-acquired the rights in the mid-2000s following the fin-syn rules being repealed in 1993.  In syndicated reruns (where both original series are part of the same package for purposes of syndication), the show has been on the air in the U.S. continuously since its network screenings. In addition to airing on local stations, it has been airing multiple times each day on Cozi TV, Up TV, and Hallmark Drama. In the past, it has aired on WPIX, WPHL, TV Land, TBS, INSP, and Hallmark Channel, as well as other stations worldwide.  In Canada, reruns of the series began airing weeknights on CTS, a Christian-based network, as of September 1, 2008.  Amazon Prime Video’s Freevee digital channel is also currently airing the series, using the mostly uncut video masters provided by Lionsgate.

Because of its historical context and its connection to the book series, it is deemed acceptable for use by the FCC to meet federal E/I programming guidelines. The show is typically stripped (run five days a week) in syndication, which is enough to completely cover a TV station's E/I requirements and more.

NBC owns ancillary rights and thus is the worldwide licensor for home entertainment rights as well. Sister company NBCUniversal Television Distribution (now renamed as NBCUniversal Syndication Studios since 2021) also distributes the series internationally with MGM Television handling international distribution sales.

Home media

The entire series has been released on standard-definition DVD, high-definition Blu-ray, and on both standard and high-definition Digital Copy.  In addition, some individual episodes have been released on DVD and VHS. Starting with Season 7, the Blu-ray's are available exclusively through Amazon.com.

There are multiple DVD sets which are noticeably different from one another. The original DVD sets sold in the U.S. and Canada were released under license from NBCUniversal by Imavision Distribution, a company based in Quebec. A majority of the episodes in the original North American DVD versions had scenes cut from the episodes—these were derived from the syndicated television versions by Worldvision Enterprises, the series' former distributor. Other episodes (especially in Season Eight) were time compressed and are NTSC-converted video prints from UK PAL masters, while others were derived from 16MM syndication prints, also from Worldvision. Only a handful of episodes in the original sets were in their original uncut versions. The episodes in these original sets are also known to have relatively poor video quality, such as tracking lines, as well as audio problems, though the quality issues are not as pronounced in the first few seasons as they are in the later seasons. The first three seasons of the old sets notably are also missing closed captioning.

These original North American DVD sets included interviews with former cast members Alison Arngrim, Dabbs Greer and Dean Butler. For the original movies & complete series sets, Imavision provided numerous additional special features, including additional interviews with many of the cast members such as Melissa Gilbert and Melissa Sue Anderson, as well as specials highlighting Michael Landon, the casting of the show, and more. Imavision also released a French-language version of the series. Both versions are in NTSC color and are coded for all regions. Later copies of these original sets were distributed by Lionsgate Home Entertainment following their acquisition of Imavision, but these should not be confused with the Lionsgate re-releases described below. The DVD sets sold in the United Kingdom were released by Universal Playback (a Universal Studios Home Entertainment label); this version is in PAL color and coded for region 2. Unlike the original North American DVD sets, the UK version contains mostly uncut episodes.

In 2014, Lionsgate Home Entertainment began re-releasing the series in North America on DVD, and also for the first time, in high definition on Blu-ray, as well as Digital Copy through providers such as Vudu and Amazon Video. These new releases, which are stated to come direct from the original broadcast masters, contain mostly uncut episodes and are remastered to have superior picture and sound. The Blu-rays, with their high bitrate, high definition 1080p picture (as opposed to standard definition picture on the DVDs) currently provide the best viewing experience of the show that is commercially available.  The first six seasons on Blu-ray notably also contain lossless audio as opposed to the compressed audio on the DVDs. Starting with Season 7, Lionsgate chose to only release the remaining Blu-ray's exclusively through Amazon.com.  In the process, they made several other changes to the Blu-ray's including compressing the audio (though with a relatively high bitrate), simplifying the on-screen disc menus, and eliminating the slipcovers and included Digital Copy codes that had been present for the previous seasons.

The newer Lionsgate remastered sets all contain English, French, and Spanish audio as well as English subtitles. They do not include the special features present on the earlier non-remastered releases, but rather seasons 1 through 6 each contain a roughly 15 minute segment of a special called "The Little House Phenomenon". Season 1 also contains the original Pilot movie. Season 7 contains no special features. Seasons 8 & 9 contain the three post-series movie specials as extras, with "Look Back to Yesterday" and "The Last Farewell" appearing on Season 8, and "Bless All The Dear Children" appearing on Season 9. Some fans of the show have been perplexed as to why Lionsgate did this, both because all of the movies take place after the Season 9 timeline, and also because they included "The Last Farewell" on Season 8 when that is considered by fans to be the end to the show given its significant and memorable ending. Lionsgate's decision as to which movies to include on which season appears to have been based on broadcast order rather than production order, since "Bless All The Dear Children" was the last episode broadcast even though "The Last Farewell" was the last one produced. None of the available releases of the series contain "The Little House Years", which was a three-hour Thanksgiving special aired during Season 6 that largely consisted of flashback clips.

While the re-releases are substantially better than what was previously available, there are a handful of episodes that still were released in edited form or contain other problems. The most significant of these, affecting all formats of the remastered releases, include over 3 minutes missing from the Season 7 episode, "Divorce, Walnut Grove Style," almost 4 minutes missing from Season 9's "Home Again," and extremely low volume of the townspeople's singing on the English audio of the last scene of the final movie, "The Last Farewell."

List of releases

In Australia, Region 4, The first releases were release by Magna Pacific (NBC Home Entertainment) on October 22, 2004 (Season 1 Parts 1 & 2) and November 12, 2004 (Season 2 Parts 1 & 2) and re-released early 2008. No further seasons were released. On April 29, 2008 Universal starting releasing the series beginning with Season 3 (Parts 1 & 2) and Series 4 (Parts 1 & 2) on July 1, 2008, and then Season 1 (Parts 1 & 2), Season 2 (Parts 1 & 2) and Season 3 (Parts 1 & 2 on March 8, 2010 and followed by the remaining series with the finale season being released on May 2, 2012. Via Vision then acquired the rights to the series and began releasing Uncut & Digitally Remastered version on May 6, 2015 and the final season on April 20, 2016. Also released are Complete Season boxset, the first two being non remastered and the latest version being the remastered Deluxe Edition.

Reception 
The pilot movie ranked at number 3 for the ratings in early 1974. The first two seasons the series aired on Wednesday nights at 8pm. Season 1 had moderate ratings, season 2 was the lowest ranked season of the series. In 1976 the series was moved to a Monday night time slot. From season three through season seven it was one of NBC'S highest rated scripted series. By seasons 8 and 9 the ratings were dropping and it was no longer NBC'S highest rated scripted series.

Season 1 (1974–75): No. 13, 23.5 rating
Season 2 (1975–76): No. 33
Season 3 (1976–77): No. 16, 22.3 rating
Season 4 (1977–78): No. 7, 24.1 rating
Season 5 (1978–79): No. 14, 23.1 rating
Season 6 (1979–80): No. 16, 21.8 rating
Season 7 (1980–81): No. 10, 22.1 rating
Season 8 (1981–82): No. 25, 19.1 rating (tied with: The Facts of Life)
Season 9 (1982–83): No. 29, 17.4 rating

Accolades
1976: TP de Oro, Spain, Mejor Actriz Extranjera (Best Foreign Actress), Karen Grassle 
1978: Emmy Award for Outstanding Cinematography in Entertainment Programming for a Series, Ted Voigtlander, episode "The Fighter"
1979: Emmy Award for Outstanding Cinematography for a Series, Ted Voigtlander, episode "The Craftsman"
1979: Emmy Award for Outstanding Music Composition for a Series, David Rose, episode "The Craftsman"
1980: TP de Oro, Spain, Mejor Actriz Extranjera (Best Foreign Actress), Melissa Sue Anderson 
1981: Western Writers of America Spur Award for Best TV Script, Michael Landon, episode "May We Make Them Proud"
1982: Emmy Award for Outstanding Achievement in Music Composition for a Series (Dramatic Underscore), David Rose, episode "He Was Only Twelve" (Part 2)
1983: Young Artist Award for Best Young Actress in a Drama Series, Melissa Gilbert
1984: Young Artist Award for Best Young Actress in a Drama Series, Melissa Gilbert

Spin-offs and sequels

Little House: A New Beginning
When Michael Landon decided to leave the show (though he stayed on as executive producer and occasional writer and director), a spin-off sequel show was created, the focus now placed on the characters of Laura and Almanzo, and more characters were added to the cast. A new family, the Carters (Stan Ivar as John, Pamela Roylance as Sarah, Lindsay Kennedy as older son Jeb, and David Friedman as younger son Jason), move into the Ingalls house. Meanwhile, Almanzo and Laura take in their niece, Jenny Wilder (played by Shannen Doherty), when Almanzo's brother dies and raise her alongside their daughter, Rose. The Wilders appear prominently in some episodes, while in others they appear only in early scenes used to introduce the story or its characters. The explanation given for the original characters' absence was that they moved to Burr Oak, Iowa, to pursue a promising life. The show lost viewers, because the Ingalls family (except Laura) left the series.

Backdoor pilot 

The spin-off’s finale episode, Hello and Goodbye, in which Laura and Almanzo finish renovating the late Mrs. Flannery's home into a boardinghouse and start to take in residents, was meant as a backdoor pilot for an entirely new spinoff alongside what was supposed to have been another few seasons of the original show.

In that episode, Mr. Edwards moved in after his mute son Matthew left with his father and he realized that not only was his cabin falling down, it was situated a considerable distance from all his friends.

Willie and Rachel, wanting their own space and to be out from under Harriet's thumb in the rooming house upstairs of the hotel and restaurant  elected to move in with Laura and Almanzo, as well, while Willie cooked and ran the restaurant with Rachel.

Writer Sherwood Montague rounded out the ensemble and the show was supposed to have covered his attempts to bring sophistication to Walnut Grove, but low viewership led to cancellation of both the sequel show and the intended spinoff.

The three movie specials listed below were produced to tie up loose ends to storylines on both the two main series and those opened up in Hello and Goodbye.

Movie specials 
Three made-for-television post-series movies followed during the 1983–84 television season: Little House: Look Back to Yesterday (1983), Little House: The Last Farewell (1984), and Little House: Bless All the Dear Children (1984).

In The Last Farewell, Charles and Caroline decide to visit Walnut Grove. They learn that a railroad tycoon actually holds the deed to the township, and he wants to take it over for his own financial gain. Despite their best efforts, the townspeople are unable to drive the businessman away. At a town meeting, John Carter offers a supply of explosives that he has. Each man takes a turn blowing up his own building in an emotional farewell to the town.

When asked why the set was blown up, the show's producer, Kent McCray, said that when the series started, he made an agreement with the property owners that at the end of the series he would put the acreage back to its original state. When the production crew were estimating the cost of dismantling all the buildings, Michael Landon thought for a while and said, "What if we blow up the town? That would get the buildings all in pieces and you can bring in your equipment to pick up the debris and cart it away." He then said that he would write it where they blow up all the buildings, except for the little house and the church. Both McCray and Landon wept as the town blew up.

Bless All the Dear Children was filmed prior to The Last Farewell, but ended up being the last of the three movies to air. Given its Christmas-related content, NBC made a last-minute decision to change the broadcast order, airing it during the Christmas season.  A voice-over was added explaining the events occurred prior to the destruction of the town to resolve the continuity problem.

Two other Little House movies were made in conjunction with the Landon series: the 1974 pilot for the program and The Little House Years (1979), a Thanksgiving special/clip show that aired in the middle of season six.

The pilot film inspired a miniseries in 2005 which was also heavily inspired by the novels of the same name.

Film adaptation 
In October 2012, Sony Pictures announced that a film adaptation of the Little House on the Prairie novel was under development. In early 2016, it was widely reported that Paramount Pictures had picked up the project in turnaround, but an agreement was never reached.  In December 2020, it was announced that Paramount Television Studios and Anonymous Content were developing a reboot as a one-hour dramatic series adaptation.

References

External links

Little House On The Prairie Episode Guide
 Little House On The Prairie
 Little House Books

1970s American drama television series
1970s Western (genre) television series
1974 American television series debuts
1980s American drama television series
1980s Western (genre) television series
1983 American television series endings
English-language television shows
 
NBC original programming
Period family drama television series
Period television series
Television series about families
Television series by Universal Television
Television series set in the 1870s
Television series set in the 1880s
Television shows based on American novels
Television shows set in Minnesota
Television shows filmed in California